Senator Capps may refer to:

Gilmer Capps (1932–2019), Oklahoma State Senate
John Paul Capps (born 1934), Arkansas State Senate